Kalisz is a city in central Poland.

Kalisz may also refer to:

 Kalisz (surname)
 Kalisz, Masovian Voivodeship, east-central Poland
 Kalisz, Pomeranian Voivodeship, north Poland
 Kalisz Pomorski, a small town in West Pomeranian Voivodeship, north-west Poland
 WSK-Kalisz, the Polish aircraft engine maker PZL

See also
 Kalisz County, a county (powiat) east of Kalisz
 Kalisz Department, a former subdivision of the Duchy of Warsaw 1807–1815
 Kalisz Voivodeship (disambiguation)
 Kaliski (disambiguation)
 Khalyzians (Hungarian: Kalász), ethnic name for a member of a Turkic people known as the Kaliz